"Not Now John" is a song by the progressive rock band Pink Floyd, written by Roger Waters. It appears on the album The Final Cut (1983). The track is the only one on the album featuring the lead vocals of David Gilmour, found in the verses, with Roger Waters singing the refrains and interludes, and was the only single released from the album (discounting "When the Tigers Broke Free", a non-album single retroactively added to the album in 2004). It reached No. 30 in the UK Singles Chart.

Music video
In the Final Cut video EP, the video for the song depicts a Japanese boy walking through a factory searching for a soldier. The child is confronted by factory workers playing cards and geisha girls before he falls to his death from a scaffold and is discovered by a World War II veteran (played by Alex McAvoy, who also played the schoolteacher in Pink Floyd – The Wall). The video was directed by Waters' then brother-in-law, Willie Christie.

Composition
It is the only track on the album not to feature exclusively Waters on lead vocals. Unlike the majority of other tracks on The Final Cut (1983), "Not Now John" takes an upbeat, driving, tempo – and hard rock style – for much of its duration. Gilmour and Waters split vocals duties, similar to the song "Comfortably Numb" from The Wall (1979), and they represent different "characters" or points of view – Gilmour is the self-serving ignorant layperson while Waters is the intellectual, responsible observer of the world's woes.

"Not Now John" is notable for being one of the few Pink Floyd tracks to feature strong profanity, as the word "fuck" occurs in the album version of the song seven times: six times as part of the phrase "fuck all that", and near the end of the song as "Where's the fucking bar, John?".

Single
"Not Now John" was released as a single in April 1983. The words "fuck all that" were overdubbed as "stuff all that" by Gilmour, Waters, and the female backing singers, while the "Where's the bar?" lyric is sung in Italian, Greek and French, as the single fades out before the English iteration.

"The Hero's Return" was released as the B-side, featuring an additional verse not included on the album. A 12" single was released in the UK, featuring the two 7" tracks on side 1 and the album version of "Not Now John" on side 2. The single hit number 30 in the UK and number seven on the US Mainstream Rock Tracks chart.

 "Not Now John" (single version) – 4:12
 "The Hero's Return (Parts I and II)" – 4:02
 "Not Now John" (album version) – 4:56 (12" single only)

Critical reception
In a review for The Final Cut (1983) on release, Kurt Loder of Rolling Stone described "Not Now John" as "one of the most ferocious performances Pink Floyd has ever put on record." In a retrospective review of The Final Cut (1983), Rachel Mann of The Quietus described "Not Now John" as "fun, but musically crass and obvious," further saying "this is Surrey Blues rock as vapid as the views it seeks to satirize."

Personnel
Pink Floyd
 Roger Waters – co-lead vocals, bass guitar, twelve-string guitar, tape effects, synthesizer
 David Gilmour – co-lead vocals, electric guitar
 Nick Mason – drums

Additional musicians
 Andy Bown – Hammond organ
 Doreen Chanter – backing vocals (call and response)
 Irene Chanter – backing vocals (call and response)

See also
 List of anti-war songs

References

External links
 

Pink Floyd songs
1983 singles
British hard rock songs
Macaronic songs
Protest songs
Songs about nuclear war and weapons
Songs written by Roger Waters
Song recordings produced by Roger Waters
1983 songs
Harvest Records singles
Columbia Records singles

he:Not Now John